Henri Claude Fertet (27 October 1926 – 26 September 1943) was a French schoolboy and resistance fighter who was executed by the German occupying forces during World War II. He was posthumously awarded several national honours. He is known for the letter he wrote to his parents on the morning of his execution, and he has become one of those who symbolise the French Resistance.

Early life and background
Fertet was born on 27 October 1926 in Seloncourt, Doubs, France, to primary schoolteachers. His father too was named Henri; the sources do not record his mother's name. He had a brother, Pierre, who was three years younger. His first schooling was at Seloncourt, where his parents worked. In 1937, the family moved to Velotte in Besançon, where the younger Henri attended the Lycée Victor-Hugo de Besançon. He was determined, lively, intelligent, and affectionate; he was passionate about archaeology and history.

Career 
During the school summer holidays of 1942 while World War II was ongoing, he joined a Resistance group in Larnod (near Besançon) led by Marcel Simon, a 22-year-old farmer.

Groupe Guy Mocquet mounted thirty-one known operations between November 1942 and July 1943. Fertet shot and fatally wounded the officer, but the unexpected arrival of a motorcyclist meant that Fertet and Reddet failed to seize the documents.

Capture 
Groupe Guy Mocquet was then actively hunted down. Several members were arrested in June.

On 15 September, twenty-three prisoners from three Resistance groups were brought before Feldkommandantur 560 to answer for crimes of which they were accused. The trial lasted four days. Despite the able advocacy of their lawyers, Paul Koch and Fernand Mouquin, seventeen of them were sentenced to death on 18 September. Simon and Reddet were among them; Fertet was the youngest. Under German law, no-one under the age of 18 could be sentenced to death barring exceptional circumstances. The court ruled that the cases of Fertet (age 16) and Reddet (age 17) were exceptional. The lawyers filed legal appeals; Henry Soum, the préfet of Doubs, the Archbishop of Besançon, and the Swiss consul pleaded for general mercy. The sentence of one of the condemned, André Montavon, a 24-year-old Swiss national, was commuted to a term of imprisonment.

Execution and burial 
At around dawn on Sunday, 26 September, the sixteen condemned men were told that their appeals had been rejected. They were provided with writing materials and given the opportunity to compose a last letter. They were taken to the Citadel of Besançon and, between 7:36 and 8:25 AM, shot in batches of four. The German officer who commanded the execution party reported that they had all refused blindfolds and died bravely, shouting "Vive la France!"

In defiance of German orders, local people covered their graves, identified only by numbers, with flowers. After the war, Fertet's body was exhumed and cremated; his ashes and those of his father, who had died in the meantime, were scattered at Sermoyer, Ain.

Fertet's farewell letter
The original of Fertet's farewell letter has not survived. However, it was soon copied and circulated clandestinely. On 9 December 1943, French journalist (and postwar politician) Maurice Schumann broadcast it on BBC radio from London.  On 5 June 2019, French president Emmanuel Macron read extracts from it aloud, in French, at a 75th-anniversary commemoration of the Normandy landings, in Portsmouth, England, one of the embarcation ports.

In this English translation, the passages which Macron read out are in plain type, and the remainder are in italics.

Posthumous recognition

After the Liberation of France, Fertet was honoured with the distinctions of Chevalier de la Légion d'honneur, Compagnon de la Libération (presented in 1947 to Fertet's father by de Gaulle in person), Croix de Guerre 1939–1945, Croix du combattant volontaire de la Résistance, Médaille de la Résistance française, and the rank of aspirant ('officer candidate') in the French Forces of the Interior.

The following are named in his memory: Rue Henri Fertet, Besançon, a street; Collège Henri Fertet, Sancey, a middle school; Lycée des Métiers Henri Fertet, Gray, a technical college; and a tram route in Besançon.

Fertet's parents were anticlerical; that is, they opposed the influence of priests and of the Church in secular affairs. Fertet, however, was a devout Catholic, as were many of Groupe Guy Mocquet. It is paradoxical that he has become a sort of Republican saint.

Epilogue
On 26 or 27 November 1980, in the Forest of Chailluz near Besançon, Fertet's brother Pierre, a 51-year-old instituteur, and his octogenarian mother gassed themselves to death with the exhaust fumes of their car. Pierre had been much affected by his brother's death, and had venerated him, to the point of obsession. Pierre had refused to allow publication of Henri's letter without his express permission while he lived.

In 2013, Pierre's daughter, Myriam Fertet-Boudriot, Henri's last living relative, donated a collection of memorabilia to the Musée de la Résistance et de la Déportation in the Citadel of Besançon.

Memorials

Notes

References

Further reading
 
 
 
 
  By .

External links
 . Emmanuel Macron reads Fertet's letter at Portsmouth on 5 June 2019.

1926 births
1943 deaths
People from Doubs
French Resistance members
People executed by Nazi Germany by firing squad
Executed children
Chevaliers of the Légion d'honneur
Companions of the Liberation
Recipients of the Croix de Guerre 1939–1945 (France)
Recipients of the Resistance Medal
French children